Dimorphotheca dregei, or bietou, is a species of plant from South Africa.

Description 
It has strongly toothed linear leaves.

flowers are most common in August and September. Solitary radiate flowers grow on long stems. The flowers are purple with white rays that are brown on the bottom.  The disc florest are sterile. The triangular achenes (small, dry fruit that contain a single seed) are small with small bumps and round toothed margins.

Distribution and habitat 
This species is endemic to the Western Cape of South Africa. It grows on sandstone slopes between the Bokkeveld Mountains, Bredasdorp, and Klein Swartberg.

References 

Plants described in 1838
Flora of South Africa
dregei